Eucalyptus andrewsii, commonly known as the New England blackbutt, is a tree native to New South Wales and Queensland in eastern Australia. It is a tree with rough bark on the trunk and larger branches, lance-shaped often curved leaves, flower buds in groups of between eleven and fifteen and hemispherical or cup-shaped fruit.

Description
The leaves are the same colour on both surfaces. Flowering occurs in summer and winter and the flowers are white.

Taxonomy and naming
Eucalyptus andrewsii was first formally described in 1904 by Joseph Maiden from specimens collected in "many parts of the New England". The description was published in Proceedings of the Linnean Society of New South Wales. The specific epithet (andrewsii) honours the Australian geologist and botanist, Ernest Clayton Andrews.

Distribution and habitat
New England blackbutt grows in woodland on shallow stony rises north from the Niangala district in New South Wales to the Eungella district in Queensland. It occurs in scattered populations but is locally common.

References

andrewsii
Myrtales of Australia
Flora of New South Wales
Flora of Queensland
Trees of Australia
Plants described in 1904
Taxa named by Joseph Maiden